Sriti may refer to:

 Ali Sriti (1919-2007), Tunisian oudist, composer, and music teacher
 Sriti Jha (born 1986), Indian actress

See also
 Smriti